The Fourth Lee Kuan Yew Cabinet is the fourth Cabinet of Singapore formed by Prime Minister Lee Kuan Yew. It was formed in 1972 after the 1972 Singaporean general election. The cabinet lasted from 1972 to 1976, with one shuffle in 1975.

Ministers

Ministers of State and Parliamentary Secretaries

References 

Executive branch of the government of Singapore
Lists of political office-holders in Singapore
Cabinets established in 1972
Lee Kuan Yew